Northpoint Christian School (NCS) is a private, coeducational, college preparatory Christian school founded as a segregation academy. Located in Southaven, Mississippi. NCS was founded in 1973 by a group of Baptist ministers in the Whitehaven section of Memphis, Tennessee. Programs for kindergarten through Grade 8 began in 1973, and grades 9-12 were added the following year. The school is dually accredited with SAIS and the Southern Association of Colleges and Schools. NCS is also a member of the Association of Christian Schools International, the TAIS, and the TSSAA. As of 2014, the school was the third-largest private school in Greater Memphis. For the 2022-2023 school year, they are celebrating their 50th anniversary of the schools creation.

History
NCS was established in 1973 as a segregation academy formed by white parents seeking to avoid sending their children to racially integrated public schools. NCS was established shortly after a busing policy was established in Memphis.

In 1988, after what the school claimed was "The area was losing professionals as well as families who could afford to send their children to SBEC." The school moved from Memphis, Tennessee, to suburban Southaven, Mississippi as many white people of Memphis were moving to Southaven at that time during white flight.

Prior to the 2013-2014 school year, the school was known as Southern Baptist Educational Center (SBEC).

On April 29, 2022, Northpoint was criticized by Memphis local news source, WMC-TV,reported that a teacher put signs of "colored" and "whites" over water fountains for a civil rights lesson, while alarming questions and criticisms, the current president, Jim Ferguson, defended it as "part of a lesson plan".

Campuses

Memphis 
The  Memphis campus, located at the intersection of Holmes Road and Tulane Road, was utilized from 1974 until 1988, when it was sold to the Memphis City School System. There is no information available on where their former location was originally in Memphis, only the school started in Memphis

Southaven 
The school campus relocated to Southaven, Mississippi, a Memphis suburb, in September 1988. The  campus contains facilities for grades pre-K through 12. Specifically, the building contains over 40 regular classrooms, 3 computer labs, 4 science labs, a science lecture lab, a library/media center, a cafeteria, a multi-purpose room, and a performing arts center. The campus also includes a sportsplex, which contains a football stadium and track, baseball stadium, softball stadium, soccer field, and tennis courts. The football stadium includes two concession stands.

In 2008, an expansion was constructed just east of the main building. This building contains 12 additional high school classrooms and the high school office, in addition to a gymnasium with a turf room and locker rooms.

Athletics
Despite being located in Mississippi, NCS competes in Division II, Class A of the Tennessee Secondary School Athletic Association (TSSAA). Other members of their division are:
Davidson Academy (Nashville)
First Assembly Christian School (Cordova)
 Franklin Road Academy (Nashville)
 Friendship Christian School (Lebanon)
King's Academy (Seymour)
Lighthouse Christian (Millington)
Memphis Catholic High School (Memphis)
Rossville Christian Academy (Rossville)
St. Andrews (Sewanee)
 Tipton-Rosemark Academy (Millington)
Evangelical Christian School (Cordova)
St. George's (Collierville)

Sports offered at NCS include: baseball, boys and girls basketball, cheerleading, cross country, football, boys and girls golf, boys and girls soccer, softball, swimming, tennis, track, volleyball, and trap shooting.

NCS is home to 4 State Titles in athletics. 2004 Football, 2009 Baseball, 2016 and 2017 Girls Basketball.

See also
List of private schools in Mississippi

References

External links 
 http://www.ncstrojans.com/

1972 establishments in Mississippi
Christian schools in Mississippi
Educational institutions established in 1972
Private high schools in Mississippi
Schools in DeSoto County, Mississippi
Private middle schools in Mississippi
Private elementary schools in Mississippi
Segregation academies in Mississippi